CleanGenius (previously known as MacCleaning developed by EaseUS) is utility software for Apple Inc.'s macOS. It is used to clean the potentially unneeded files on the macOS startup disk, uninstall the application by removing its core files, preference files, cache files and proper support files. This software includes the direct version on EaseUS official website and the App Store version in Apple Inc.'s Mac App Store

Features

System cleaning
CleanGenius supports the cleaning of potentially unwanted files or temporary files left by macOS and certain programs, such as Safari. To clean out or remove:
System and user Cache files in the macOS Caches folder.
System and user log files in the macOS Logs folder.
Deleted files in the macOS Trash folder.
Downloaded or other files in the macOS Downloads folder.

Duplicate finder
The duplicate function is used to find and remove all duplicated files on the disk.

Advanced uninstall
The Uninstall applications function is a replacement for the ordinary Mac remove program method, which is to drag and trash the applications directly. CleanGenius differentiates itself by additionally deleting the files located in directories other than that of the original application, such as preference files, etc.

Disk usage
CleanGenius intuitively marks file/folder size with different colors by Disk Usage function.

Free memory 
CleanGenius allows the users to manually release the inactive memory in the Mac and reclaim more memory. macOS does not release inactive memory until free memory runs out. When free memory is not enough for the fresh application, macOS will release part of the inactive memory for the new demand. This mechanism would hit the performance of the application which launches for the first time with the insufficient free memory.

Different usage in the Mac memory: 
Free: The unused memory.
Wired: The used memory for the system and application core components.
Active: The used memory for the running system and application processes.
Inactive: The used memory for cache purpose. It stores the information of quit applications. If those applications rerun later, they will be launched notably faster.

Mounted devices ejector
CleanGenius provides an alternate method to eject mounted devices. The difference from the Mac's default eject method is that multi-mounted devices can be ejected simultaneously by CleanGenius.

Disk space monitor
The disks space usage status is visualized in real time by CleanGenius. When disk free space is lower than 10%, the visualizer will show a colorful alert.

Set login items
CleanGenius provides an alternate method to manage macOS login items. You can delete, hide or add applications to the login items list. The login items automatically run every time macOS is booting up.

References

External links
 CleanGenius Homepage

Uninstallers for macOS